Oded Zehavi (born 2 February 1961) is an Israeli composer, arranger and pianist. A professor of music in the University of Haifa.

Biography 
Zehavi was born in Jerusalem to Alex (brother of the journalist Nathan Zehavi and the scientist Avinoam Zehavi) and Pnina Zehavi. He studied with the composers  Andre Hajdu, George Crumb, and Sheila Silver and with the theoreticians Eugene Narmore and Leonard Mayer. In 1993 he completed his PhD and since then he's been active in composing music for concerts, theatre, and dance as well as for movies in cinema and on TV.

Zehavi's Music was performed by important orchestras around the world, among them the Kirov Orchestra, the London Philharmonic Orchestra, and the Israel Philharmonic Orchestra, with conductors Antonio Papen, Valery Gergiev, Leonard Slatkin, Noam Sheriff, Marek Janowski, Mendi Rodan, Stanley Sperber, and Yaron Traub.

In 1995 he founded the music dept. in the University of Haifa and served as Chair of the dept. until 2006. Zehavi is a professor in the dept and continues to teach in it. Additionally he teaches in the Rimon School of Jazz and Contemporary Music and is active in the music field in Israel.

In 2012 he started anchoring with Amnon Rubinstein a weekly program on Kol Hamusica called "Morning Music for Bus and Truck Drivers"

Zehavi is married to Keren and is a father of two.

Awards and honors 
 Society of Authors, Composers and Music Publishers in Israel "Golden Feather" award
 Prime Minister Award for Musical composition
 Angel Award
 Rosenblum Award for Performing Arts
 Pais award 2004

References

External links 
 Oded Zehavi personal website
 Oded Zehavi on the University of Haifa Music Dept. site
 Oded Zehavi, excerpt from the series "Exposed" from the University of Haifa YouTube channel, April 28, 2015 

Israeli composers
Israeli pianists
1961 births
Living people
21st-century pianists